The Okanagan, also known as the Okanagan Valley and sometimes as the Okanagan Country, is a region in the Canadian province of British Columbia defined by the basin of Okanagan Lake and the Canadian portion of the Okanagan River. It is part of the Okanagan Country, extending into the United States as Okanogan County in north-central Washington. According to the 2016 Canadian census, the region's population is 362,258. The largest populated cities are Kelowna, Penticton, Vernon, and West Kelowna.

The region is known for its sunny climate, dry landscapes and lakeshore communities and particular lifestyle. The economy is retirement and commercial-recreation based, with outdoor activities such as boating and watersports, skiing and hiking. Agriculture has been focused primarily on fruit orchards, with a recent shift in focus to vineyards and wine.

The region stretches northwards via the Spallumcheen Valley to Sicamous in the Shuswap Country, and reaches south of the Canada–United States border, where it continues as Okanogan County. The Okanagan as a region is sometimes described as including the Boundary, Similkameen, and Shuswap regions, though this is because of proximity and historic and commercial ties with those areas.

Etymology
The name is derived from the Okanagan-language place name ukʷnaqín. An alternate explanation from Washington proposes "People living where you can see the top", ostensibly of Chopaka Peak in the Lower Similkameen.

Geography 

The area was occupied by Pleistocene glaciation, and a widespread mantle of glacial drift covers the underlying bedrock.
At the end of the Pleistocene, marginal lakes formed along the sides of the melting ice lobe and streams deposited their loads in them as deltas and accumulations of silt.
These accumulations now form the white cliffs which are particularly prominent along the southern end of Okanagan Lake.

Geographic features include:

Kalamalka Lake
Mabel Lake
Mahoney Lake
Mara Lake
McIntyre Bluff
Monashee Mountains
Mount Boucherie
Okanagan Highland
Okanagan Lake
Okanagan River
Osoyoos Lake
Shuswap River
Skaha Lake
Swan Lake
Thompson Plateau
Tuc-el-nuit Lake
Vaseux Lake
Wood Lake

Major highways 

Highway 97 (Okanagan Highway)
Highway 3 (Crowsnest Highway)
Highway 97C (Okanagan Connector)
Highway 33
Highway 6
Highway 97A

Provincial parks

Climate 

The Okanagan has a mild, relatively dry climate that varies depending on latitude. Most of the Okanagan lies within the rain shadow of the Cascade Mountains to the southwest. Areas in the north end of the valley receive more precipitation and cooler temperatures than areas to the south. Generally, Kelowna is the transition zone between the drier south and the wetter north.

The Okanagan north of Kelowna has a humid continental climate (Köppen: Dfb) with warm, sometimes hot summers and cold winters with highs around freezing, though mild by Canadian standards. Precipitation is well distributed year round. Some regions of the Okanagan, most notably near Kelowna, border on an inland oceanic climate due to it having an average temperature slightly above  and below . Dry forests of ponderosa pine and low grasses dominate the valleys and mountains in this region.

The Okanagan south of Kelowna has a semi-arid climate (Köppen: Bsk) with hot, dry summers and cool winters. The average annual precipitation in this region is also the second driest in Canada outside of the Arctic, the driest being the Thompson River Valley west of Kamloops. The southern Okanagan is dominated by northern reach of the Columbia Plateau ecoregion and is the only xeric shrubland ecosystem in Canada. Dry forests of ponderosa pine and low grasses can be found at higher elevations to the east. Despite being located in a xeric shrubland, areas near Osoyoos and Oliver claim to be part of Canada's only desert.

Between 2000 BCE and 1900 CE, the climate and vegetation of the Okanagan had changed little. However, historical records from the Pacific Agrifood Research Station in Summerland indicate that the Okanagan climate had warmed by about 1 °C between 1908 and 1994.

History 

The Okanagan Valley is home to the Syilx, commonly known as the Okanagan people, an Interior Salish people who live in the valley from the head of Okanagan Lake downstream to near the river's confluence with the Columbia River in present-day Washington, as well as in the neighbouring Similkameen Valley and the Upper Nicola to the north of that, though the whole of their traditional territory encompasses the entire Columbia River watershed and includes areas east of the Okanogan River in Washington, i.e. the Colville Reservation.  At the height of Okanagan culture, about 3000 years ago, it is estimated that 12,000 people lived in this valley and surrounding areas. The Okanagan people employed an adaptive strategy, moving within traditional areas throughout the year to fish, hunt, or collect food, while in the winter months, they lived in semi-permanent villages of kekulis, a type of pithouse. Today the member bands of the Okanagan Nation Alliance are sovereign nations, with vibrant natural resource and tourism based economies. Their annual August gathering near Vernon is a celebration of the continuance of Syilx life and culture.

In 1811, the first non-natives came to the Okanagan Valley, in the form of a fur trading expedition voyaging north out of Fort Okanogan, a Pacific Fur Company outpost at the confluence of the Okanogan and Columbia Rivers. Within fifteen years, fur traders established, known as the Brigade Trail via the Cariboo Plateau and Thompson Country to Fort Kamloops and through the Okanagan, from Fort Alexandria at the southern end of the New Caledonia fur district in the Central Interior to the north, to Fort Vancouver, the HBC's headquarters in the Columbia Department, for passing furs between New Caledonia and the Columbia River for shipment to the Pacific. The trade route lasted until 1846, when the Oregon Treaty laid down the border between British North America and the United States west of the Rocky Mountains on the 49th parallel. The new border cut across the valley, bisecting Osoyoos Lake. To avoid paying tariffs, British traders forged a newer route that bypassed Fort Okanogan via the Fraser Canyon from Spuzzum up over the Cascade Mountains, then via the Nicola, Coldwater and Fraser rivers to Fort Langley instead of to Fort Vancouver, which had come into being in American territory. The Okanagan Valley did not see many more outsiders for a decade afterward.

In 1859, the first European settlement was established when Father Charles Pandosy led the making of an Oblate mission at Okanagan Mission, now a neighbourhood of Kelowna. The Fraser Canyon Gold Rush of 1858 eventually encouraged more settlement as some prospectors from the United States took the Okanagan Trail route on their way to the Fraser Canyon, although at the height of the rush the American adventurers who used the route did not settle because of outright hostilities from the Syilx, whom a few of the parties traversing the trail had harassed and brutalized.  A few staked claims around the South Okanagan and Similkameen valleys and found gold and copper in places, with another trail from Fort Hope to newer goldfields at Rock Creek and Wild Horse Creek in the East Kootenay, skirting the US border and crossing Osoyoos Lake at Osoyoos, which was a customs post and also the location of the gold commissioner's office.  The Dewdney Trail, surveyed and built by Edgar Dewdney, was constructed to prevent trade in the region from going north-south instead of remaining firmly under British control, and also for military mobility purposes should the need arise.  In the decades following the gold rushes, ranchers, mostly on military land grants, came to settle on Okanagan Lake; notable ones included the Coldstream Ranch near Vernon, the Ellis Ranch, which formed the basis of the City of Penticton once subdivided, and the Richter Ranch, which continues in operation today, in the mountains between the Town of Oliver and the Village of Keremeos in the Similkameen.

A mining industry began in the southern Okanagan region, with Fairview, now an empty benchland on the western side of Oliver, the best-known and largest of the boomtowns created in the later part of the 19th century.  More farmers, as well as a small service industry, came to meet the needs of the miners.

Fruit production is a hallmark of the Okanagan Valley today, but the industry began with difficulty. Commercial orcharding of apples was first tried there in 1892, but a series of setbacks prevented the major success of commercial fruit crops until the 1920s. Until the 1930s, the demand for shipping fruit and other goods did drive a need for ongoing operations of the sternwheeler steamboats that serviced Okanagan Lake, operated by a subsidiary of the Canadian Pacific Railway, linking the Southern Mainline with the original transcontinental mainline at Sicamous: the SS Aberdeen from 1886 and then the SS Sicamous and SS Naramata from 1914, and others. The Sicamous and Naramata survive as a tourist attraction on Okanagan Beach on the north side of Penticton, the Sicamous serving both as a museum and also an event facility. Other steamboats operated on Skaha Lake to the south of that city.  The club lounge and wheelhouse, without any keel or hull, of the SS Okanagan are in the same park as the Sicamous and Naramata.

While the last half-century has grown several resource-based enterprises in the region, primarily forestry, though mining had played an important role in earlier times. The fastest-growing industries in the Okanagan today are real estate, tourism accommodations and services, and retirement-driven real estate development as well as the ripping up of orchards and their replacement by wineries and vineyards.   Favoured by its sunny climate, lakes, and winery attractions, the valley has become a popular destination for vacationers and retirees. The area also attracts seasonal fruit-picking labourers, primarily from Quebec and Mexico.

Demographics 

The population of the region was 362,258 as of the 2016 Canadian census.  The three regional districts within the Okanagan and their populations were: Central Okanagan (194,822), North Okanagan (83,022) and Okanagan-Similkameen (84,354).

The statistical figures below are based on the 2011 Canadian census, 2016 Canadian census, and the British Columbia Ministry of Communities, Sport and Cultural Development.

Municipalities 

Statistics Canada. 2017. Armstrong, CY [Census subdivision], British Columbia and Okanagan, RD [Census division], British Columbia (table). Census Profile. 2016 Census. Statistics Canada Catalogue no. 98-316-X2016001. Ottawa. Released February 8, 2017.
http://www12.statcan.gc.ca/census-recensement/2016/dp-pd/prof/index.cfm?Lang=E (accessed April 16, 2017).

Designated places

Unincorporated communities

North Okanagan
Cherryville
Grindrod
Lavington

Central Okanagan
Carr's Landing (part of Lake Country)
Okanagan Centre (part of Lake Country)
Okanagan Mission (part of Kelowna)
Oyama (part of Lake Country)
Lakeview Heights (part of West Kelowna)
Rutland (part of Kelowna)
Westbank (part of West Kelowna)
Winfield (part of Lake Country)

South Okanagan
Faulder
Fairview (part of Oliver) 
Shingle Creek
Okanagan Falls

Indian reserves
The Indian reserves of the Okanagan first peoples also form identifiable communities:
Osoyoos Indian Band
Penticton Indian Band
Westbank First Nation (Kelowna)
Okanagan Indian Band (Vernon)

The Osoyoos and Westbank Indian Reserves have large non-native populations because of band-governed residential and commercial development on their lands.  The Osoyoos Indian Reserve leases large swathes of land to commercial vineyard developments and is where 40% of wine grapes used in the Okanagan come from.

Sport
Ice hockey is a popular sport in the region with WHL team Kelowna Rockets playing in the region's most populated city. The Jr. A teams are the Vernon Vipers, West Kelowna Warriors and the Penticton Vees of the BCHL. Penticton were the 2012 national Jr. A champions, after they ousted the Woodstock Slammers for the title. Jr. B sides Kelowna Chiefs, Summerland Steam, Osoyoos Coyotes and North Okanagan Knights play in the KIJHL, Osoyoos having won the 2010/11 KIJHL season. Penticton and Summerland are both home to Chicago Blackhawks and Edmonton Oilers Defenceman Duncan Keith.

The area has been host to multiple junior hockey championships, including the Memorial Cup in Kelowna in 2004 and RBC Cup in Vernon in 1990 (then called the Centennial Cup) and 2014.

Kelowna is home to junior Canadian football team Okanagan Sun, and Jr. Baseball team Kelowna Falcons, including the UBC Okanagan Heat university program.

Agriculture 

The continued growth and operation of the agricultural industry in the Okanagan absolutely depends on the employment of temporary migrant workers.

In 2009, there were 3,000 Mexican migrant labourers working in the Okanagan.

See also 
 Okanagan Basin Water Board
 Okanagan Country
 Sunshine tax

References

External links 

 Okanagan Historical Society Reports—A visual record of the Society’s Annual Report from its first issue in 1926 from the UBC Library Digital Collections
 Digitized Okanagan History—A repository of digitized photographs and records related to the history of B.C.'s Southern Interior

 
Geographic regions of British Columbia
Interior of British Columbia
Valleys of British Columbia